Raleigh Eugene Drennon (September 21, 1908 – February, 1965) was a college football player.

Georgia Tech
Drennon was a prominent guard for the Georgia Tech Yellow Jackets of the Georgia Institute of Technology. Drennon is a member of the Georgia Tech Athletics Hall of Fame.

1928
Drennon was a member of the national champion 1928 team, selected All-Southern that year. Coach William Alexander called him the "best all around guard that ever put a cleat into Grant Field."

He received an appointment to West Point in 1930.

References

External links

1908 births
1965 deaths
American football guards
All-Southern college football players
Georgia Tech Yellow Jackets football players
Players of American football from Atlanta